The following is a list of the largest satellite cities worldwide, with over 500,000 people. A satellite city is defined as subordinate to a central city in a business or infrastructure sense, and it may or may not have more population than the central city due to arbitrary municipal definitions.

Excluded are transborder agglomerations. In the Pop date column, C stands for census, P for provisional result, E for estimate.  Although the list is ordered by population for ease of reference, the figures are not comparable with each other due to different dates and lack of updates by respective countries.

Satellite cities by population
 Satellite cities are generally suburbs or bedroom communities but not always; an example is a capital that is dwarfed by a megacity. Large satellite cities may be as densely populated as a megacity.
 Cities in mainland China are often defined as prefectures or counties; for the sake of simplicity, they are listed in a separate list as explained in the respective section.
 Taiwan municipalities Taichung, Taoyuan, New Taipei, Tainan , and, Kaohsiung are usually large in area as they merged with their respective surrounding suburb counties in December 2010, thus becoming direct-controlled municipalities.
Therefore, it is excluded here.
 Malaysia has multiple types of local government, which confusingly overlap as the system was partially but not completely overhauled.
 Local data may be outdated for many of the least-developed nations, and as such may not be comparable.

Satellite cities in China and Taiwan
Cities in the People's Republic of China and Republic of China are often defined in way as prefectures/counties. Their prefecture/county limits often are physically more extensive than entire metropolitan areas, encompassing large rural areas and outright separate cities.  "Satellite city" may be located both within the municipality and/or adjacent to it, depending on how the area agglomerated.  Some urban districts, as in the case of Wanzhou Urban District in Chongqing Municipality (Province Level), are separated by farmlands from the core metropolitan area and functions as a satellite city in spite of naming.

As to what constitutes a "city" in the PRC, there exist other definitions of city limits are in actual usage, such as combination of several districts where urban area of the central city is dominant, or roads, railways, natural boundaries, or a combination thereof.  This is commonly designated by the central statistics bureaus as "urban districts", however some counties are also included, as well as some cities opt for towns rather than counties.  Some counties/districts (e.g. Handan County, Handan City(Prefecture level)) are indeed satellites of their respective central cities (e.g. Congtai, Hanshan, Fuxing districts of Handan City(Prefecture level) are a common definition of true urban area of Handan, although this definition now often also involves Handan County as the city expands).

In the case of Chaoshan Metropolitan Area, Jieyang (Prefecture-level city) urban districts border that of the central city of Shantou (Prefecture-level city), effectively spanning neighboring municipalities.  Complicating the matter is the nesting of city structures, as Jieyang municipality itself is a satellite of Shantou, even though Puning city (County level city, and can be a satellite of Shantou) lies within Jieyang's jurisdiction.

References

Satellite cities
Lists of cities (worldwide) by population
Satellite